Thomas Drew (9 June 1875 – 9 January 1928) was an Australian cricketer. He played four first-class matches for South Australia between 1897 and 1903.

Personal life
Drew entered  Trinity College in 1899, while studying Medicine at the University of Melbourne. He graduated in 1901 with a Bachelor of Medicine, and in 1905 married Blanche Ada Smith in London, daughter of J.H. Smith, former Commissioner of the South Australian Railways.

In 1928, while employed as medical officer for the Australian Mutual Provident Society, Drew died from what was determined to be a case of accidental morphia poisoning. He had complained of not feeling well and it was believed he had taken morphine to assist sleep. He was found unconscious and struggling to breath and although taken to hospital died shortly after arrival. He was 52 years old.

See also
 List of South Australian representative cricketers

References

External links
 

1875 births
1928 deaths
Australian cricketers
South Australia cricketers
London County cricketers
People educated at Trinity College (University of Melbourne)